Pogue Hollow is a valley in Reynolds County in the U.S. state of Missouri. Pogue Hollow is also a cove at Lake of the Ozarks named for the same reason.

Pogue Hollow was most likely named after W. A. Pogue, an early settler.

References

Valleys of Reynolds County, Missouri
Valleys of Missouri